SM City Bacolod is a supermall located along Rizal Street, Reclamation Area, Bacolod, Negros Occidental, Philippines. SM City Bacolod is the 29th supermall of SM Prime Holdings, the 1st SM supermall in Negros Island Region and the 3rd in the Visayas. SM City Bacolod is currently undergoing renovation and expansion that will be completed in phases. The first phase was completed in 2013, while the second phase was finished in October 2014.

Before expansion 

Originally, SM City Bacolod was composed of two one story wings (the North and the South). The mall size was  before any further expansions.

Each wing had one major hallway that fit all its stores at the time. Each side of the wing had two escalators that lead up to the bridges that connect the entire mall.

The main food court was initially located in the South Wing before the second expansion in 2014.

Mall features

SM City Bacolod mall is divided into two buildings called the "North Wing" and the "South Wing". The two buildings are connected by two bridge ways that allow patrons to walk between the two structures.

Every entrance of the mall is guarded by a security guard. Some entrances have guards that carry a sensor to detect a firearm or another unwanted item inside the mall. Remaining entrances have a security guard present with a screening sensor a customer must walk through.

Transportation
The mall is very accessible by means of Jeep, tricycle and "padyak" or "pedicab" (pedicab is a bicycle with attached side car, much like a tricycle, though they are a silent version, and uses human pedal power to transport passengers.)

North Wing 
The "North Wing" section of SM City Bacolod was the main focus of the recent renovation in 2016.

Its expansion allowed for a "U-shaped" hallway to take place where the main entrance is located at the bottom of the letter.

The main entrance from the north side of the wing includes restaurants and cafes, such as Krispy Kreme, BreadTalk, and Giligan's, for customers to dine in.

Much of the city's festivities and holidays are centered at this section of the mall.

For Christmas 2017, the mall incorporated a giant Christmas tree and various decorations to celebrate the holiday.

During January 2018, this main entrance had an event, dubbed "Celebrations", for local businesses to offer their services to customers.

1st floor 
The first floor of the "North Wing" is mostly composed of restaurants in its outer border. Restaurants can be located throughout the wing and to the connecting bridges. Most restaurants allow for indoor and outdoor entrance by customers of SM City Bacolod.

The main department store (The SM Store) is also located in the northeast sector of the North Wing. Its area coverage is found throughout the first and second floor of the mall.

More stores are located near the bridge escalators. Many of the stores that functioned before the expansion are still present in the wing.

2nd floor 
The second floor of the North Wing includes many clothing and technology companies. The outer section includes many clothing stores such as Nike, The North Face, and Columbia Sportswear.

The center of the second floor includes the "SM CyberZone" and the mall's main food court.

Gadgets for phones and computers can be purchased at the "SM CyberZone" where local and global businesses such as Samsung, Lenovo, and Apple, are selling these devices.

The mall's food court is lined up with competitors (Sbarro, Four Seasons, and Kamay Kainan, and more) to feed hungry customers. The seating allows for customers to view the remaining floors of the "North Wing".

This floor allows for direct access to the bridges that lead customers to the "South Wing".

3rd floor 
The third floor is mostly to fashion salons and stores. There are some cafes and small restaurants scattered throughout as well.

Arcades 
Arcades are also located in this floor of the mall. World of Fun and Quantum offer people of all ages to play games and win prizes here. Students often attend these places after school or during the weekend.

SMX Convention Center Bacolod

With an area of 8,218 square metres, SMX Bacolod is located on the third floor of the Annex Building. SMX Bacolod offers 3 function rooms and 6 meeting rooms, totaling 4,269 square meters of leasable space that can accommodate anything from an audience of 5,000 to an exclusive conference for 10.

SMX Convention Center Bacolod had its soft-opening on October 16, 2014 and its grand opening on November 23, 2014.

SMX Bacolod hosted an APEC meeting last April 29–30, 2015, with its theme "Disaster Risk Finance – APEC Roadmap for Resilient Economies."

South Wing 
The "South Wing" has yet to be renovated or expanded. There is one main floor in this wing along with a second level to the entrance of the connecting bridges.

Like the "North Wing", there are restaurants found on the outer section of the wing (Jollibee, KFC, and many more).

Many home goods are bought in this wing due to stores such as Ace Hardware and The SM Appliance Store being present.

SM Cinemas 
The SM Cinemas movie theatre is located on the southeast sector of the "South Wing".

There is a total of four watchable theatres in this area. A food concessions stand is located right next to the ticket booth as well.

Many films, including international movies, are premiered here due to the lack of stand-alone movie theatres in Bacolod City.

SM Supermarket 
The SM Supermarket entrance is found in the south sector of the wing. There is another entrance located on the south side of the mall where most customers park (that are only going to the SM Supermarket).

Canned, fresh, imported, and local food are sold in bulk at this market. Customers can also buy any items that aid in cooking or home cleaning.

Many food stands are located right by the cashier section. Some of the food stand selection include Potato Corner and Zagu.

SM Supermarket also offers services to hold personal belongings or bought goods for customers at the inner entrance of the store.

Connecting Bridges 
There are two indoor bridges that allow for customers to explore the "North Wing" and the "South Wing" without being affected by weather conditions. The bridges are sealed with large glass windows to offer the view of Rizal Street as well as the Guimaras Strait.

These bridges have numerous shops that sell sunglasses, watches, and accessories for customers. Also found on these bridges are salons, spa, and a barbershop (Jems Barber).

Entrance from Rizal Street is offered to reach up to the connecting bridges. There is a singular staircase located halfway through each bridge.

Expansion
Plans bared by SM Prime Holdings will see a P2.5 billion three-storey expansion plan on both the North and South wings while the existing mall structure will be extended to two-storeys.

The expansion will accommodate 150 more store tenants which is set to be completed in phases (some have already been opened).

A new hotel named, Park Inn by Radisson Bacolod is also being constructed in SM City Mall. The hotel is planning to furnish 153 guest rooms, all connected to free Wi-Fi. This addition is planned to open in the third quarter of 2020.

Location 
SM City Bacolod is located in the urban area of Bacolod City.

From the connecting bridges of the two wings, one can see the Guimaras Strait (West) and the San Sebastian Cathedral (East).

The BREDCO port of Bacolod City is a minute (1 kilometer) away from SM City Bacolod.

Hotels near this mall include L'Fisher Hotel, Avenue Suites, Bacolod Business Inn, and others.

Transportation 
To arrive to SM City Bacolod, many customers take a taxi, a Jeepney, a tricycle, or a bus. The main drop off's for most vehicles are found in the "North Wing" entrance, the entrances by the bridges, and the "South Wing" entrance.

Mall culture 
There are more malls found in the Philippines than parks. The cultural nature of Filipinos have influenced such events to take place at malls like SM. Due to the extremely hot temperatures in Southeast Asia, malls are a place where many Filipinos flock and take shelter from the heat. The malls offer a place for Filipinos to escape from their everyday work/school life.

See also
SM City Cebu
SM City Consolacion
SM City Davao
SM City Iloilo
SM Seaside City Cebu
Capitol Central

References

Shopping malls in the Philippines
Shopping malls established in 2007
SM Prime
Buildings and structures in Bacolod
2007 establishments in the Philippines